"Shepherd of Fire" is the second single from Hail to the King, the sixth studio album from American heavy metal band Avenged Sevenfold.  Released on November 7, 2013, it was a No. 1 single on the US Mainstream Rock charts. 

"Shepherd of Fire" is the theme song of the Call of Duty: Black Ops II Zombies map "Origins", included in the final downloadable content compilation Apocalypse. It is also featured in the mixed martial arts game EA Sports UFC.

Personnel
Avenged Sevenfold
 M. Shadows – vocals
 Zacky Vengeance – rhythm guitar, backing vocals
 Synyster Gates – lead guitar, backing vocals
 Johnny Christ – bass guitar, backing vocals
 Arin Ilejay – drums
Session musicians

 Mike Elizondo, Brent Arrowood – Sound fx
 David Campbell – Orchestra arranger & conductor
 Suzie Katayama – cello
 Ed Meares – upright bass
 Joe Meyer, John Reynolds – french horn
 John Fumo, Rick Baptist – trumpet
 Alan Kaplan – trombone 
 Steven Holtman, Andrew Martin – bass trombone
 Douglas Tornquist – tuba

Charts

Weekly charts

Year-end charts

Certifications

References

External links

2013 songs
2013 singles
Avenged Sevenfold songs
Music videos directed by Wayne Isham
Song recordings produced by Mike Elizondo
Warner Records singles